Cellach (hypocoristic Cellachán) is an Irish name. It might refer to:

 Cellach of Killala (fl. mid-6th century), supposed first Bishop of Killala in Ireland
 Cellach I of Cennrígmonaid, a 9th/10th-century bishop
 Cellach II of Cennrígmonaid, a 10th-century bishop
 Cellach mac Máele Coba, a 7th-century High King of Ireland
 Cellach mac Fáelchair, king of Osraige
 Cellach mac Rogallaig (d. 705), a king of Connacht
 Cellach Cualann, a 7th/8th-century king of Leinster
 Cellach mac Dúnchada, king of Leinster
 Cellach mac Brain, king of Leinster
 Cellach mac Faelan, king of Leinster
 Cellachán Caisil, a 10th-century king of Munster
 Cellach húa Rúanada, Irish poet (d. 1079, Annals of Ulster)
 Saint Cellach, 11th/12th-century bishop of Armagh
 Ceallach Spellman (b. 1995), English actor, TV and radio host